ATSC 3.0 is a major version of the ATSC standards for television broadcasting created by the Advanced Television Systems Committee (ATSC). It is the first "all IP" broadcast standard and operates close to the 'Shannon limit'. 

The standards are designed to offer support for newer technologies, including HEVC for video channels of up to 2160p 4K resolution at 120 frames per second, wide color gamut, high dynamic range, Dolby AC-4 and MPEG-H 3D Audio, datacasting capabilities, and more robust mobile television support. The capabilities have also been foreseen as a way to enable finer public alerting and targeted advertising.

The first major deployments of ATSC 3.0 occurred in South Korea in May 2017, in preparation for the 2018 Winter Olympics. In November 2017, the FCC approved the voluntary use of ATSC 3.0 (branded as "Next Gen TV") for television broadcasting in the United States; there will not be a mandatory transition as there was from analog NTSC to ATSC, and full-power stations that convert must preserve the availability of their programming in their city of license via legacy ATSC signals. In December 2021, Jamaica adopted ATSC 3.0 for its impending transition from analog to digital television, with Television Jamaica launching ATSC 3.0 service the following month.

Technical details

Bootstrap
ATSC 3.0 uses a bootstrap signal which allows a receiver to discover and identify the signals that are being transmitted. The bootstrap signal has a fixed configuration that can allow for new signal types to be used in the future.  The bootstrap signal can also carry information to wake up a receiver so that it can receive an emergency alert message.

Physical layer
ATSC 3.0 uses a highly efficient physical layer that is based on orthogonal frequency-division multiplexing (OFDM) modulation with low-density parity-check code (LDPC) FEC codes. With a 6 MHz channel the bit rate can vary from 1 Mbit/s to 57 Mbit/s depending on the parameters that are used. ATSC 3.0 is limited to 64 physical layer pipes (PLP) with a recommended 4 simultaneous PLPs per complete delivered product. The multiple PLPs in a channel may have different robustness levels used for each PLP. An example of how PLP can be used would be a channel that delivers HD video over a robust PLP and enhances the video to UHD with Scalable HEVC Video Coding layer over a higher bitrate PLP.

Audio
ATSC 3.0 supports Dolby AC-4 and MPEG-H 3D Audio.

Video
ATSC 3.0 supports three video formats: legacy SD video, interlaced HD video, and progressive video. Legacy SD Video and Interlaced HD Video support frame rates up to 30 fps. Legacy SD Video and Interlaced HD Video are included for compatibility with existing content and can't use HDR, HFR, or WCG.

Legacy SD video
Legacy SD video supports resolutions up to 720×480 and supports High Efficiency Video Coding (HEVC) Main 10 profile at Level 3.1 Main Tier.

Interlaced HD video
Interlaced HD video supports 1080-line interlaced video with 1,920 or 1,440 pixels per line, and supports HEVC Main 10 profile at Level 4.1 Main Tier.

Progressive video
Progressive video supports resolutions up to 3840×2160 progressive scan and supports HEVC Main 10 profile at Level 5.2 Main Tier. Progressive video supports frame rates up to 120 fps and the Rec. 2020 color space. Progressive video supports HDR using hybrid log–gamma (HLG) and perceptual quantizer (PQ) transfer functions.

Watermark
ATSC 3.0 supports digital watermarking of the audio signal and video signal.

Public alerting 
A U.S.-based coalition known as the Advanced Warning and Response Network Alliance has advocated for the use of ATSC 3.0 features, including datacasting and digital network interoperability, in order to provide an emergency alert system with support for embedded rich media and finer geo-targeting.

In November 2021, AWARN and ATSC jointly filed comments in response to questions posed about ATSC 3.0 alerting capabilities in the FCC's Further Notice of Proposed Rulemaking as required by the National Defense Authorization Act of 2021.

Analog audio fallback
Unlike ATSC 1.0, ATSC 3.0 theoretically supports the continued use of an analog audio subcarrier in addition to the digital signal by narrowing the bandwidth of the channel to 5.5 MHz wide (ATSC 1.0 requires the full 6 MHz bandwidth). On June 10, 2021, the FCC granted KBKF-LD in San Jose, California, a special temporary authority (STA) to transmit an analog FM audio subcarrier at 87.75 MHz, the same frequency as the audio subcarrier on an NTSC analog video signal. KBKF-LD's sister station WRME-LD was granted a similar special temporary authority shortly before the end of low-power analog television on July 13, 2021. The STA has implications for the dozens of remaining analog low-power television stations on physical channel 6, which operate as FM radio stations using that NTSC subcarrier and face a July 13 deadline to convert to digital; a digital signal is not compatible with standard FM radio nor with the American digital radio standard, HD Radio. KBKF must report any interference issues to the FCC twice during the STA's term, once at 90 days and again at 180 days. The initial 90-day filings demonstrated that the shared channel space was a success.

History
On March 26, 2013, the Advanced Television Systems Committee announced a call for proposals for the ATSC 3.0 physical layer which states that the plan is for the system to support video with a resolution of 3840×2160 at 60 fps (4K UHDTV).

In February 2014, a channel-sharing trial began between Los Angeles television stations KLCS (a public television station that is a PBS member) and KJLA, a commercial ethnic broadcaster owned-and-operated by LATV, with support from the CTIA and approval of the Federal Communications Commission.  The test involved multiplexing multiple HD and SD subchannels together, experimenting with both current MPEG-2 / H.262 and MPEG-4 AVC / H.264 video codecs.  Ultimately, it has been decided that H.264 would not be considered for ATSC-3.0, but rather the newer MPEG-H HEVC / H.265 codec would be used instead, with OFDM instead of 8VSB for modulation, allowing for 28 Mbit/s to 36 Mbit/s or more of bandwidth on a single 6-MHz channel.

In May 2015, and continuing on for six months afterward, the temporary digital transition transmitter and antenna of Cleveland, Ohio's Fox affiliate, WJW, was used by the National Association of Broadcasters to test the "Futurecast" ATSC 3.0 standard advanced by LG Corporation and GatesAir. In September 2015 further tests in the Baltimore and Washington, D.C. area were announced by Sinclair Broadcast Group's Baltimore station, WBFF, which is also a Fox affiliate. The Futurecast system had previously been tested in October 2014 during off-air hours through Madison, Wisconsin ABC affiliate WKOW.  Unlike ATSC 1.0/2.0's Distributed Transmission System's pseudo-single-frequency network operations, WI9XXT's two transmitters operate as a true Single-Frequency Network.

Further tests began on January 6, 2016, of ATSC 3.0 with High Dynamic Range (using the Scalable HEVC video codec with HE-AAC audio) from Las Vegas independent station, KHMP-LD on UHF 18.  It would later be joined in these tests by Sinclair's CW affiliate, KVCW simulcasting on a temporary test frequency (UHF 45).

On January 20, 2016, a working group in South Korea led by LG Electronics and others performed the first "end-to-end" broadcast of 4K resolution programming via an ATSC 3.0 signal, using an IP transmission from the Seoul Broadcasting System's Mok-dong studio to feed a transmitter on Gwanak Mountain. The broadcaster's technical director stated that the successful test "highlights the potential for Korea's launch of terrestrial UHD TV commercial services using ATSC 3.0 in February 2017." Following the test broadcast, South Korean broadcasters announced that they planned to launch ATSC 3.0 services in February 2017.

On March 28, 2016, the Bootstrap component of ATSC 3.0 (System Discovery and Signalling) was upgraded from candidate standard to finalized standard.

On June 29, 2016, NBC affiliate WRAL-TV in Raleigh, North Carolina, a station known for its pioneering roles in testing the original ATSC standards, launched an experimental ATSC 3.0 channel carrying the station's programming in 1080p, as well as a 4K demo loop. WRAL-EX has also carried 4K coverage of the 2016 Summer Olympics and 2018 Winter Olympics in an experimental manner.

Countries and territories using ATSC 3.0

South Korea
On July 27, 2016, South Korea's Ministry of Science, ICT and Future Planning officially endorsed ATSC 3.0 as the country's broadcasting standard for ultra-high-definition television. On January 6, 2017, LG Electronics announced that their 2017 4K TVs sold in South Korea would include ATSC 3.0 tuners.

On May 31, 2017, SBS, MBC, and KBS officially launched their full-time ATSC 3.0 services in major South Korean markets such as Seoul and Incheon. The launch had been delayed from February 2017 due to issues obtaining the required equipment.

The transition made South Korea the first country in the world to deploy a terrestrial UHD format, and enabled 4K broadcasts of the 2018 Winter Olympics in Pyeongchang County.

United States

On February 2, 2017, the Federal Communications Commission (FCC) issued a notice of proposed rulemaking (NPRM) that would allow for the deployment of ATSC 3.0 in the United States. The Notice of Proposed Rulemaking seeks comments on issues such as carriage obligations, interference, public interest obligations, simulcasting, and a tuner mandate. Gary Shapiro of the Consumer Technology Association (CTA) has stated that a TV tuner mandate is not necessary and that it should be market-driven and voluntary. On February 24, 2017, the FCC voted unanimously to approve two portions of the NPRM, opening the door for manufacturers to begin producing ATSC 3.0 hardware.

On November 14, 2017, the Pearl consortium (comprising a number of major broadcasting conglomerates, including Cox Media Group, Graham Media Group, Hearst Television, Gray Television, Nexstar Media Group, E. W. Scripps Company, and Tegna Inc.) announced that it would use Phoenix, Arizona as a test market for an ATSC 3.0 transition in 2018. Two days later, the FCC voted 3–2 in favor of an order authorizing voluntary deployments of ATSC 3.0 (referred to under the branding "Next Gen TV"); stations that choose to deploy ATSC 3.0 services must continue to maintain an ATSC 1.0-compatible signal that is "substantially similar" in programming to their ATSC 3.0 signal (besides programming that leverages ATSC 3.0 features, and advertising), and covers the station's entire community of license (the FCC stated that it would expedite approval for transitions if the loss in over-the-air coverage post-transition is 5% or less). This clause will remain in effect for at least five years; permission from the FCC must be obtained before a full-power station can shut down its ATSC signal, but low-power stations are exempt from the simulcasting requirement and are allowed to flash-cut to ATSC 3.0 if they choose.

ATSC 1.0 signals will still be subject to mandatory carriage rules for television providers during the five-year simulcasting mandate; the FCC stated that voluntary carriage of 3.0 signals by television providers would be left to the marketplace. The order does require stations to provide sufficient on-air notice about transitions to ATSC 3.0 services. The FCC will not allocate a second channel to each broadcaster to enable a gradual consumer transition. Instead, it has been suggested that multiple broadcasters in each market cooperate by locating multiple degraded ATSC 1.0 services on a single transmitter. At the same time, the broadcasters would share the remaining transmitters for ATSC 3.0 transmissions. After sufficient consumer adoption, ATSC 1.0 transmissions would be abandoned, allowing stations to return to operation on their owned transmitters. It is unclear how the complications of this approach would be overcome, especially in light of spectrum reallocation in heavily populated markets. The FCC published its final rules on ATSC 3.0 to the Federal Register on February 2, 2018, and they formally took effect 30 days afterward.

As the transition is voluntary, the FCC will not require ATSC 3.0 tuners to be included in new televisions, and there will not be a subsidy program for the distribution of ATSC 3.0-compatible equipment.

As part of the ATSC 3.0 trials by Pearl, Univision's KFPH-CD in Phoenix was converted to an ATSC 3.0 station on April 9, 2018, which will be shared by Univision and several other broadcasters. Univision and Sinclair Broadcast Group were also planning a trial in Dallas, which would utilize spectrum vacated by KSTR-DT and KTXD-TV to test ATSC 3.0 transmission using a single-frequency network. On September 26, 2019, the Consumer Technology Association (CTA) announced that it would use the certification mark "NextGen TV" (stylized "NEXTGEN TV") to promote equipment that is compliant with the ATSC 3.0 standard. 

The major network affiliates in Las Vegas became the first to launch permanent ATSC 3.0 signals on May 26, 2020.

Jamaica
In December 2021, the Jamaica Broadcasting Commission established that Jamaica would adopt ATSC 3.0 as part of the country's transition from analog to digital television, with the transition expected to be completed in 2023. Television Jamaica concurrently joined the ATSC as its first full member from the Caribbean.

On January 31, 2022, Television Jamaica launched their first ATSC 3.0 transmitter in Kingston, making Jamaica the first country in the Caribbean and the third country in the world to launch ATSC 3.0 broadcasting. A second transmitter in Montego Bay was activated in July 2022.

Trinidad and Tobago
In January 2023, the Telecommunications Authority of Trinidad and Tobago (TATT) announced that Trinidad and Tobago would adopt ATSC 3.0 as part of the nation's transition from analog to digital television, with the transition expected to be completed in 2026.

Concerns 
Consumer advocates have noted the opportunity in which ATSC 3.0 can allow advertisers to run targeted advertising. The targeted ads would allow advertisers to track viewer ratings more directly rather than indirectly by companies such as Nielsen Media Research. The FCC is expected to defer the decision on targeted ads to be in accordance with Federal Trade Commission's guidelines on privacy.

A consortium of U.S. television providers criticized the domestic plans for the transition, citing the "voluntary" transition, inconsistencies in commitments to simulcasting arrangements for compatibility, and potential downgrades in service for ATSC 1.0 viewers, as well as how these signals will factor into retransmission consent negotiations. Early ATSC 3.0 "lighthouse" stations involved sharing agreements with major station ownership groups such as Nexstar, Sinclair, Scripps, and Tegna, while leaving out public television stations and independent broadcasters. For example, the Buffalo launch of ATSC 3.0 left out WNED-TV and WBBZ-TV.

See also
 ATSC tuner
 High Efficiency Video Coding

References

External links
ATSC website
NextGen TV website

ATSC
Digital television
Film and video technology
High dynamic range
Television transmission standards
Ultra-high-definition television